Rashtrasant Tukadoji Maharaj Nagpur University (RTMNU), formerly Nagpur University, is a public state university located in Nagpur, Maharashtra. It is one of India's oldest universities, as well as the second oldest in Maharashtra. It is named after Rashtrasant Tukdoji Maharaj, a spiritual leader, orator, and musician from Vidarbha. The university is a member of the Association of Indian Universities and the Association of Commonwealth Universities.

Vice chancellors 

 Sir Bipin Krishna Bose (1923–1928)
 Hari Singh Gour (1928–) (1936–)
Dr. Tukaram Jayram Kedar (Jan 1938-Jan 1944)
 Justice W. R. Puranik (1944–1947)
 G. B. Kadam
 Vishnu Bhikaji Kolte (1966–1972)
 M. G. Bokre
 Bhalchandra Chopane
 D. Y. Gohokar (1975–1977)
 Vilas Sapkal
 Dr. M. A. Chansarkar (1985-1988)
 Dr. S. N. Pathan
 Siddharthavinayaka P. Kane (2015–2020)
 Dr. Subhash R. Chaudhari (2020–present)

Faculties and Departments 
The university is composed of the Faculties of Arts & Humanities, Science, Social Sciences, Home Science, Medicine, Commerce, Education, Engineering & Technology, Law, and Ayurveda, consisting of 39 Postgraduate teaching departments (PGTD) and three constituent colleges (the Law College, College of Education, and the Laxminarayan Institute of Technology). The departments and college buildings are spread over seven campuses with an overall area of 327 acres.

Academics

Rankings

The National Institutional Ranking Framework (NIRF) ranked it 144 among engineering colleges in 2020.

Affiliated colleges
Its jurisdiction extends over 4 districts -Bhandara,Gondia,Nagpur,Wardha  .

Notable alumni

References

External links
 RTM Nagpur University website
 RTMNU e-Shiksha, a digital initiative taken by the RTM Nagpur University to facilitate e-learning for the students.

 
1923 establishments in India
Educational institutions established in 1923
Universities and colleges in Nagpur
Universities in Maharashtra